
Gebidumsee (or "Gibidumsee") is a lake near Gebidum Pass in the municipality of Visperterminen, Valais, Switzerland.

External links
  

Lakes of Valais